Canuellidae is a family of copepods belonging to the order Polyarthra.

Genera

The family contains the following genera:

Brianola 
Canuella 
Canuellina 
Canuellopsis 
Coullana 
Echinosunaristes 
Elanella 
Ellucana 
Galapacanuella 
Ifanella 
Indicanuella 
Indocanuella 
Intercanuella 
Intersunaristes 
Microcanuella 
Nathaniella 
Parasunaristes 
Scottolana 
Sunaristes

References

Copepods